The Juno Awards of 1978, representing Canadian music industry achievements of the previous year, were awarded on 29 March 1978 in Toronto at a ceremony hosted for a second consecutive year by David Steinberg at the Harbour Castle Hilton Convention Centre. A 2-hour broadcast of the ceremonies was available nationally on CBC Television. 1500 people were present at the ceremonies.

At a news conference following the awards, on 31 March 1978, Stompin' Tom Connors announced he would return his Juno trophies to awards organiser CARAS as a protest against rewarding "Juno jumpers" or artists who do not maintain a residence or presence in Canada. Connors earlier withdrew his nomination as Country Male Vocalist of the Year.

Nominees and winners

Female Vocalist of the Year
Winner: Patsy Gallant

Other nominees:
 Carroll Baker
 Claudja Barry
 Charity Brown
 Joni Mitchell

Male Vocalist of the Year
Winner: Dan Hill

Other nominees:
 Burton Cummings
 Gordon Lightfoot
 Valdy
 Gino Vannelli

Most Promising Female Vocalist of the Year
Winner: Lisa Dalbello

Other nominees:
 Claudja Barry
 Alma Faye Brooks
 Glory-Anne Carriere
 Roxanne Goldade

Most Promising Male Vocalist of the Year
Winner: David Bradstreet

Other nominees:
 Peter Pringle
 Walter Rossi
 Malcolm Tomlinson
 Pat Travers

Group of the Year
Winner: Rush

Other nominees:
 April Wine
 Bachman–Turner Overdrive
 The Stampeders
 Trooper

Most Promising Group of the Year
Winner: Hometown Band

Other nominees:
 Prism
 Max Webster
 Jackson Hawke
 Black Light Orchestra

Composer of the Year
Winner: Dan Hill (Co-composer), "Sometimes When We Touch"

Country Female Vocalist of the Year
Winner: Carroll Baker

Other nominees:
 Julie Lynn
 Anne Murray
 Chris Nielsen
 Colleen Peterson

Country Male Vocalist of the Year
Winner: Ronnie Prophet

Other nominees:
 Gary Buck
 Wilf Carter
 Jimmy Arthur Ordge
 Ray Griff

Multiple Juno winner Stompin' Tom Connors withdrew his nomination to protest Junos given to expatriate Canadians.(Green and King, CanadianEncyclopedia.ca)

Country Group or Duo of the Year
Winner: The Good Brothers

Folk Singer of the Year
Winner: Gordon Lightfoot

Other nominees:
 Bruce Cockburn
 Dan Hill
 Murray McLauchlan
 Valdy

Instrumental Artist of the Year
Winner: André Gagnon

Other nominees:
 Liona Boyd
 Hagood Hardy
 Moe Koffman

Producer of the Year (single)
Winner: Matthew McCauley/Fred Mollin, "Sometimes When We Touch" by Dan Hill

Producer of the Year (album)
Winner: Matthew McCauley/Fred Mollin, Longer Fuse by Dan Hill

Recording Engineer of the Year
Winner:(tie)
 Terry Brown, Hope by Klaatu
 David Greene, Big Band Jazz by Rob McConnell and the Boss Brass

Canadian Music Hall of Fame
Winners:
 Guy Lombardo (posthumous)
 Oscar Peterson

Nominated and winning albums

Best Selling Album
Winner: Longer Fuse, Dan Hill

Other nominees:
 A Farewell to Kings, Rush
 The Best of the Stampeders, The Stampeders
 Le Saint Laurent, André Gagnon
 My Own Way to Rock, Burton Cummings*

Best Album Graphics
Winner:  Dave Anderson, Short Turn by Short Turn

Best Classical Album of the Year
Winner: Three Borodin Symphonies, Toronto Symphony Orchestra

Best Selling International Album
Winner: Rumours, Fleetwood Mac

Best Jazz Album
Winner: Big Band Jazz, Rob McConnell & The Boss Brass
Ed Bickert — Ed Bickert
Museum Pieces — Moe Koffman
Transformations/Invocation — Nimmons 'n' Nine Plus Six
Country Place — Don Thompson

Nominated and winning releases

Best Selling Single
Winner: Sugar Daddy, Patsy Gallant

Other nominees:
 "Let's Try Once More", Patrick Norman
 "Que Sera Sera", The Raes
 "Sometimes When We Touch", Dan Hill
 "You Won't Dance With Me", April Wine

Best Selling International Single
Winner: "When I Need You", Leo Sayer

References

External links
Juno Awards site

1978
1978 music awards
1978 in Canadian music